Khandoli Institute Of Technology (KIT), Giridih  is a private institute offering polytechnic courses. It is approved by AICTE, New Delhi, Ministry of HRD, Government of India  and affiliated to State Board of Technical Education, Jharkhand and recognised by Dept. of Science and Technology, Govt. of Jharkhand. It offers 3 years Diploma course in Mining Engineering, Mechanical Engineering, Electrical Engineering and Civil Engineering. KIT is the only private college in state offering Diploma in Mining Engineering. Jharkhand has an abundance of coal and Giridih is rich in mineral resources and has several large coal fields with one of the best qualities of metallurgical coal in India, so KIT started in 2014 with an aim of transforming Giridih as well as Jharkhand to a primary centre for technical education.
It has successfully completed 4 year and it has started its 5th year of admissions. First Batch got passed out and more than 50% student are successfully placed.

Administration 

Khandoli Institute Of Technology (KIT), Giridih is run by Vivekanand Educational and Charitable Trust (VECT). The Chairman is Er. Arvind Kumar- A Visionary Entrepreneur and good thinker about society and aim of trust.

Academic program 

KIT offers 3 year Diploma in various branches of engineering and technology. All courses are approved by Jharkhand State Board of Technical Education and AICTE.

Admission to all the courses are done through counselling of Jharkhand Combined Entrance Competitive Examination Board (JCECE)  for Polytechnic colleges. Students who appear for JCECE Polytechnic entrance exam can sit for counselling. College also take admission on merit basis under the guidance of representative of SBTE, Govt. of Jharkhand.

Placement 
The first batch of student got passed out and KIT has provide successful placement to more than 50% of its student. All placed student got their offer letter on time. Company who visited for the Campus placement are - 
(i)  DP Jindal Group
(ii) Somic ZF Components
(iii) Polyplastic Automotive India pvt ltd
(iv) Jay Bharat Motors India pvt ltd
(v) Maharasthra Seamless Limited
(vi) Modine India
(vii) Micromax
(viii) Apollo Tyre
Management is in touch with many other companies specially Coal India and other government companies for touching 100% placement in coming years.

Infrastructure 

College is spread on 15 acres of land on Khandoli-Giridih road very near to Khandoli Dam. It has fully equipped Mining Lab with Lath machine, metals. There is fully equipped lab for Chemistry, Computer, Physics, Mechanical and Electrical. A big library and store is there in a separate building. There is fully hygienic canteen in the campus. Separate Hostel facilities for Boys and girls are available along with Transport Facility.

References

Engineering colleges in Jharkhand
Education in Giridih